The 1976–77 Ice hockey Bundesliga season was the 19th season of the Ice hockey Bundesliga, the top level of ice hockey in Germany. 10 teams participated in the league, and Kolner EC won the championship.

First round

Final round

Relegation

References

External links
Season on hockeyarchives.info

Eishockey-Bundesliga seasons
Ger
Bundesliga